Saint-Marcellin-en-Forez (literally Saint-Marcellin in Forez) is a commune in the Loire department in central France.

History
Saint-Marcellin-en-Forez is at an ancient crossroads between Burgundy and Velay, on the highway from the Forez and Montbrison toward the only bridge known in the south of the Loire, which was at Saint-Rambert.

The origins of the city date back to the early Middle Ages. The earliest written reference to the town dates from 984, but a treasure of about 500 4th-century coins (discovered in 1884) indicates an even earlier settlement.

The parish church is mentioned in 1225 and the town's fortifications in 1286. The town is surrounded by a double ring of ramparts of the thirteenth century and the fifteenth century, which gives it a solid appearance.  The fortifications are pictured in Guillaume Revel's armorial (1450).

The old town, topped by a high tower, was a defensive structure that withstood repeated assaults. St Marcellin was the stronghold of the Counts of Forez, who had their castle within its walls. It then passed to the Dukes of Bourbon, then was annexed to the kingdom of France without ever having been conquered.

Populations

Twin towns
Saint-Marcellin-en-Forez is twinned with:
  Marta, Lazio, Italy

See also
Communes of the Loire department

References

Communes of Loire (department)